Nicole Alicia Aiken-Pinnock (née Aiken; born 11 December 1985) is a Jamaican netball player. Pinnock started playing international representative netball as early as 2004, although she made her senior debut in the Jamaica national team, the Sunshine Girls, at the 2006 Commonwealth Games in Melbourne. In 2007, Pinnock received a four-year scholarship to play basketball with Lamar University in Texas, where she played center for the Cardinals. However, in 2008 it was reported that Pinnock had given up the scholarship and returned to her first college, G.C. Foster.

Pinnock currently plays netball for the Sunshine Girls at international level, and for Sirens (netball) in the Netball Superleague. She captained the team to bronze at the 2014 Commonwealth Games.

References

External links 
 Sunshine Girls team profile. Retrieved on 2009-04-15.

Jamaican netball players
Jamaican women's basketball players
Netball players at the 2006 Commonwealth Games
Netball players at the 2010 Commonwealth Games
Lamar University alumni
1985 births
Living people
Centers (basketball)
Commonwealth Games bronze medallists for Jamaica
Netball players at the 2014 Commonwealth Games
Commonwealth Games medallists in netball
Netball Superleague players
Sirens Netball players
Jamaican expatriate sportspeople in Scotland
2007 World Netball Championships players
2011 World Netball Championships players
Medallists at the 2014 Commonwealth Games